John D. Hopper (January 9, 1923 – June 12, 1996) was a Pennsylvania politician. A Republican, he was a member of the Pennsylvania State Senate from the 31st district, serving from 1977 to 1992.

Biography
John D. Hopper was born on January 9, 1923, and attended Camp Hill High School. In 1941, Hopper enrolled at Dickinson College before joining the United States Army Air Corps as a volunteer and becoming a fighter pilot during World War II. In his freshman year at Dickinson, Hopper met and married Ann Bowman, with whom he later had four children. He returned to Dickinson after the war in 1945 and graduated in 1948. Turning down an offer to play professional basketball with the St. Louis Bombers, Hopper received his law degree in 1951 from the Dickinson School of Law.

Hopper worked in the insurance industry until his election in 1976 to the Pennsylvania State Senate to represent the 31st district. He served until retiring in 1992 and was a member of the Judiciary, Community and Economic Development, Labor and Industry, Military and Veterans Affairs, and the Public Health and Welfare committees. He died, aged 73, on June 12, 1996.

Hopper held a degree from the American College of Life Underwriters and was inducted into the Dickinson College Sports Hall of Fame in 1972 in recognition of his varsity basketball career there.

References

Republican Party Pennsylvania state senators
1923 births
1996 deaths
20th-century American politicians
Dickinson College alumni
Dickinson School of Law alumni
United States Army Air Forces pilots of World War II
People from Camp Hill, Pennsylvania
American World War II fighter pilots
United States Army Air Forces officers
Military personnel from Pennsylvania